is a public university in Komatsu, Ishikawa, Japan. It was established in 2018.

See also 
 Komatsu College

References

External links
 Official website 

Educational institutions established in 2018
Universities and colleges in Ishikawa Prefecture
Public universities in Japan
2018 establishments in Japan
Komatsu, Ishikawa